Lucy Ann McAleer (born November 20, 1932) is an American film and television actress. She is known for playing the role of Helen in the 1955 film My Sister Eileen.

Biography
Marlow was born in Los Angeles, California. Marlow began her screen career in 1954, playing the role of a party guest in the film Lucky Me. She then appeared in the 1954 film A Star Is Born. In 1955 Marlow co-starred as Marge Stevenson in the film Bring Your Smile Along. In the same year, she appeared in the films My Sister Eileen, Queen Bee, and two films with actor William Leslie. Her final film credit was for a starring role in the 1956 film He Laughed Last. Marlow also guest-starred in television programs including Gunsmoke, Shotgun Slade, Peter Gunn, Overland Trail and Tales of Wells Fargo.

Personal life 
Marlow married professional baseball third baseman Andy Carey in 1955. In 1956, she gave birth to her first child.

References

External links 

Rotten Tomatoes profile

1932 births
Living people
People from Los Angeles
Male actors from Los Angeles
American film actresses
American television actresses
20th-century American actresses